Constant Conversations is an extended play released by Passion Pit on September 24, 2013.

Track listing

References

Passion Pit albums
2013 EPs